Denella is a trilobite in the order Phacopida, that existed during the upper Ordovician in what is now Canada. It was described by Ludvigsen and Chatterton in 1982, and the type species is Denella cumera. The type locality was the Whittaker Formation in the Northwest Territories.

References

External links
 Denella at the Paleobiology Database

Fossil taxa described in 1982
Ordovician trilobites
Fossils of Canada
Paleontology in the Northwest Territories
Pterygometopidae
Phacopida genera